3rd Rifle Division can refer to:

 3rd Guards Motor Rifle Division
 3rd Rifle Division (Soviet Union)
 3rd Caucasian Rifle Division (Soviet Union)
 3rd Turkestan Rifle Division (Soviet Union)
 3rd Siberian Rifle Division
 20th Rifle Division, briefly known as the 3rd Rifle Division